This is a list of countries by business research and development intensity as a percentage of value added in the industry, published by the OECD in 2013.

2013 OECD rankings

* indicates "Science and technology in COUNTRY or TERRITORY" links.

See also 
List of countries by research and development spending

References 

Research And Development Spending